Ellie Haddington (born 17 February 1955 in Aberdeen) is a British actress with a career spanning over 40 years.

Early life and education 
Haddington  was born in Scotland. She trained as an actor at the Bristol Old Vic Theatre School from 1975 to 1977.

Career
Haddington appeared in 101 episodes of Coronation Street  as Josie Clarke from 1995 to 1996. Haddington's other TV credits include Dr Jekyll and Mr Hyde, Life Begins, Foyle's War (as Hilda Pierce), Endeavour, A&E, Cracker, Cutting It, Holby City, Wire in the Blood, Midsomer Murders, The Musketeers, Taggart, Scott & Bailey, Bad Girls, Guilt, New Tricks - and The Bill, in which she played two different roles, the first in 1997 and the second in 2007. She later appeared as Professor Docherty in the third-season finale of Doctor Who, entitled "Last of the Time Lords". In 1997 she played Joan Braithwaite in “Closing Ranks,” the fourth episode of the seventh series of Heartbeat. In 2001 she appeared in Midsomer Murders "Tainted Fruit", as Joan Farley.

On stage, in 2012, she appeared in Bingo at the Chichester Festival Theatre and the Young Vic.  In 2011 and 2013 she appeared in the lead role of Carol Porter in the Sky One comedy series The Café. In 2013, she appeared as Madame Dupin in the BBC TV miniseries Spies of Warsaw.

In 2015 Haddington played Gina Corbin in Ordinary Lies and Fanny Biggetywitch in Dickensian.

From 2016 to 2022, she played Julia's mother Marion in Motherland.

In 2018 she appeared in Midsomer Murders "Death of the Small Coppers" as Giny Weldon and in Endeavour "Quartet" as Millie Bagshot. In 2019, she played Dr Moss in the final episode of BBC 6-part TV drama by Russell T Davies, Years and Years.

In 2021 she reprised the part of Sheila Gemmell in the BBC black-comedy series Guilt, which was first shown on BBC Four in 2019. She also played Wendy in the Channel 4 miniseries Close to Me.

Filmography

Film

Television

Radio

Theatre credits

References

Bibliography

External links

1955 births
Living people
Scottish television actresses
Scottish stage actresses
Scottish film actresses
Scottish soap opera actresses
Scottish radio actresses
Scottish voice actresses
Royal Shakespeare Company members
20th-century Scottish actresses
21st-century Scottish actresses
Actresses from Aberdeen
Alumni of Bristol Old Vic Theatre School